Tinna Hrafnsdóttir  (born 25 August 1975)  is  an Icelandic actor, film director and screenwriter.

Filmography 

 Actor
 The Quiet Storm (2007)
 Double Existence (2011) – short
 Footsteps (2017) – short

 Director
 Helga (2016) – short
 Munda (2017) – nominated for the Edda Award for Short Film of the Year
 Quake (2021) – nominated for Best Film at the Santa Barbara International Film Festival

References

External links
 Tinna Hrafnsdóttir at the Icelandic Film Centre
 

Tinna Hrafnsdottir
Tinna Hrafnsdottir
Tinna Hrafnsdottir
Living people

1975 births